Rakin' and Scrapin' is the second album led by pianist Harold Mabern that was recorded in 1968 and released on the Prestige label.

Reception

Allmusic awarded the album 4 stars, stating that "the music is essentially boppish, with some ballads and blues included. Nothing too substantial occurs, but it is a good modern mainstream effort for the era".

Track listing 
All compositions by Harold Mabern except as noted
 "Rakin' and Scrapin'" – 7:35   
 "Such Is Life – 8:13   
 "Aon" – 9:03   
 "I Heard It Through the Grapevine" (Barrett Strong, Norman Whitfield) – 3:20   
 "Valerie" – 5:00

Personnel 
Harold Mabern – piano, electric piano
Blue Mitchell – trumpet
George Coleman – tenor saxophone
Bill Lee – bass
Hugh Walker – drums

References 

 

Harold Mabern albums
1969 albums
Prestige Records albums
Albums produced by Bob Porter (record producer)
Albums recorded at Van Gelder Studio